

List of Ministers of Education and Culture (1977-1980)

List of Ministers of Culture (1980-2006)

List of Ministers of Culture and the Media (2006-2010)

List of Ministers of Culture (since 2010)

References

External links
 Official site of the Ministry of Culture

Culture